Heart is..., also known as Hearty Paws, is a 2006 South Korean drama film directed by Park Eun-hyung and Oh Dal-kyun.

Plot 
Two siblings, an 11-year-old boy named Chan-yi (Yoo Seung-ho) and his little sister So-yi (Kim Hyang-gi), have been abandoned by their mother, and are left to survive on their own. For his sister's 6th birthday, Chan-yi decides to give her a dog. He sneaks into a house of an old couple and steals a newly born puppy, which she's been longing to have. Even though they are poor, they were happy. But everything changed after a tragic accident; So-yi died. Chan-yi blames this on his dog and finds his way to his mother, not realizing that the dog was the only true family that would never leave him.

Cast 
 Yoo Seung-ho as Chan-yi
 Kim Hyang-gi as So-yi
 Dolly as hearty
 Ahn Gil-kang
 Jung Min-ah
 Won Jang-hee
 Kim Nan-hwi
 Seo Young-hwa
 Jo Deok-jae
 Kim Gyeong-rae
 Kim Dong-young as restaurant worker	
 Baek Seung-do
 Yoo Jin-ah

Release
The film was released in South Korea on October 26, 2006, and sold 1,042,166 tickets nationwide.

Sequel

References

External links 
  
 
 
 

2006 films
2000s Korean-language films
South Korean drama films
Showbox films
Films about dogs
2000s South Korean films